Long Live Your Death (a.k.a. Don't Turn the Other Cheek!, originally titled Viva la muerte... tua!) is a 1971 Italian/Spanish/German international co-production  Spaghetti Western / action comedy film directed by Duccio Tessari. The film is mostly a send up of "political" Spaghetti Westerns (also called Zapata Westerns), like A Professional Gun and Compañeros.

Plot
In priestly disguise, the con artist Orlowsky learns from a last confession about a village where a treasure is hidden. He seeks out the Mexican bandit Max Lozoya, who knows more about its precise location – (part of) the instructions is tattooed on his ass.

At the same time, the Irish journalist Mary O'Donnell wants to fire up the revolutionary cause and bribes sheriff Randall to have the Mexican revolutionary El Salvador escape prison. Even though El Salvador is dead, the sheriff accepts, haggling up the price. It turns out that he has a scam going, where he takes money to let prisoners escape and then kills them to get a reward – and the prison warden gets half of the taking. They choose Lozoya for the escaping hero (as he is to be executed anyway). Randall is further elated when he finds the "priest" with Lozoya, because Orlowsky is his cousin, which he blames for his handicap, some affliction of the back so he must wear an iron support under the clothes to be able to walk upright. Orlowsky is locked up for later torture to death.

As it turns out the plans of the sheriff fail. The warden goes in to release Lozoya, and once they are in the corridor, the bandit knocks the warden out and helps Orlowsky to escape. It's no easy feat; Lozoya is out of shape and when he's being given a boost up by the rear over a wall, he doesn't like it. When they run into Mary, Orlowsky presents Lozoya as El Salvador and himself as his military advisor, and a confused Lozoya just goes along with it. Later it turns out that she recognised Lozoya from the beginning, but went along with it, something that gives further credit to Orlowsky's accusation that she is a journalist – "someone that creates an idol and then destroys him" – out to start an uprising just to get a story.

Initially, Lozoya takes advantage of his "El Salvador" identity solely to mobilise assistance in his play against Orlowsky. In a tavern, he frames Orlowsky for a watch theft so he can escape and talk to Mendoza alone and find the other half of the treasure map so he can have the cash for himself, but a fight breaks out, leaving Lozoya cornered in a well. Orlowsky arrives to save him, but not before punishing him by leaving him to struggle to stay on the surface first. Soon, Lozoya is forced to give the information to the treasure by dropping his pants, displaying the instructions to Orlowsky. Orlowsky knocks Lozoya out by making him drink and goes to dig. Randall and the Soldiers find Lozoya's sister Lupita and torture her for information. Miguelito, her son, tells the soldiers where Lozoya is to try and save his mother. Meanwhile, Lozoya has come to and has gotten several men to corner Orlowsky. However, Huerta arrives and ties Orlowsky and Lozoya together, before leaving them guarded. Mary rescues them and they go together to San Tomas. On the way, they find the dead bodies of Lupita and Miguelito. Distraught, Lozoya vows "to kill as many regulares as there are hairs on my sister's head". This trail of vengeance leads to general Huerta and the two partners organise an uprising against his garrison, while Mary is obliged to put her virginity on the line in order to distract the commander (she tells him, "There is more than one way to kill a woman"). However, the attack sends him running away in his underwear before she has had to go all the way.
 
As Huerta also had taken control of the aforementioned treasure, but Lozoya's gives away the money to medicine, schools and hospitals, because he "can't betray these people". Orlowsky grumbles, "I never leave empty-handed" and proceeds to betray "El Salvador" to Huerta for $30.000. The hero is executed after an exhorting speech – "For those who love freedom no idol is necessary, for those who do not, no idol is sufficient". However this is all a ruse. Lozoya is executed with blank bullets, and Orlowsky sets off explosives that kill the soldiers and Huerta (who was just preparing to execute Orlowsky). Randall and his men ambush Orlowsky but they are killed, with the assistance of the "resurrected" Lozoya. The two scoundrels then share the reward money, and Lozoya expresses relief to be "an honest bandit" again.

When Mary appears to suggest that they carry their revolutionary activities to Guatemala, the two quickly ride off.

Cast

Releases

Theatrical
For the U.S. theatrical release, the film was edited down to 93 minutes, cutting out nearly 17 minutes of footage. Star Eli Wallach came up with the title Don't Turn the Other Cheek! for the U.S. release as he believed titles with the word "death" in them performed poorly at the US box office.

Home media
Wild East released a limited edition region 0 NTSC DVD with the American title Don't Turn the Other Cheek! on 5/19/09 preserving the film's original widescreen aspect ratio. The DVD contains the full uncut version containing 17 minutes of extra footage not seen in the U.S. theatrical version. The DVD also contains alternate title sequences.

References

External links
 

1971 films
1971 Western (genre) films
Spaghetti Western films
West German films
1970s Italian-language films
Films directed by Duccio Tessari
Mexican Revolution films
Treasure hunt films
Films scored by Gianni Ferrio
1970s Italian films